Electroacupuncture is a form of acupuncture where a small electric current is passed between pairs of acupuncture needles. 
According to some acupuncturists, this practice augments the use of regular acupuncture, can restore health and well-being, and is particularly good for treating pain.  There is evidence for some efficacy (when used in addition to antiemetics) in treating moderate post-chemotherapy vomiting, but not for acute vomiting or delayed nausea severity.

Use by acupuncturists

According to Acupuncture Today, a trade journal for acupuncturists:

"Electroacupuncture is quite similar to traditional acupuncture in that the same points are stimulated during treatment. As with traditional acupuncture, needles are inserted on specific points along the body. The needles are then attached to a device that generates continuous electric pulses using small clips. These devices are used to adjust the frequency and intensity of the impulse being delivered, depending on the condition being treated. Electroacupuncture uses two needles at time so that the impulses can pass from one needle to the other. Several pairs of needles can be stimulated simultaneously, usually for no more than 30 minutes at a time."

That article adds:
"According to the principles of traditional Chinese medicine, illness is caused when chi does not flow properly throughout the body. Acupuncturists determine whether chi is weak, stagnant or otherwise out of balance, which indicates the points to be stimulated. Electroacupuncture is considered to be especially useful for conditions in which there is an accumulation of chi, such as in chronic pain syndromes, or in cases where the chi is difficult to stimulate."

Electroacupuncture is also variously termed EA, electro-acupuncture or incorporated under the generic term electrotherapy.

Electroacupuncture according to Voll (EAV) claims to measure "energy" in acupuncture points and to diagnose ailments. Some devices are registered in FDA as galvanic skin response measuring devices; they may not be used in diagnosis and treatment. Units reportedly sell for around $15,000 and are promoted for diagnosis of conditions including "parasites, food and environmental sensitivities, candida, nutritional deficiencies and much more." It is promoted for diagnosis of allergies.

Scientific research
The Cochrane Collaboration, a group of evidence-based medicine (EBM) reviewers, reviewed acupuncture and electroacupuncture for the treatment of rheumatoid arthritis.  Because of the small number and poor quality of studies, they found no evidence to recommend its use for this condition.  The reviewers concluded:
"Although the results of the study on electroacupuncture show that electroacupuncture may be beneficial to reduce symptomatic knee pain in patients with RA 24 hours and 4 months post treatment, the reviewers concluded that the poor quality of the trial, including the small sample size preclude its recommendation. The reviewers further conclude that acupuncture has no effect on ESR, CRP, pain, patient's global assessment, number of swollen joints, number of tender joints, general health, disease activity and reduction of analgesics. These conclusions are limited by methodological considerations such as the type of acupuncture (acupuncture vs electroacupuncture), the site of intervention, the low number of clinical trials and the small sample size of the included studies."

A 2016 systematic review and meta-analysis found inconclusive evidence that electroacupuncture was effective for nausea and vomiting and hyperemesis gravidarum during pregnancy.

Regarding EAV devices, "results are not reproducible when subject to rigorous testing and do not correlate with clinical evidence of allergy". There is no credible evidence of diagnostic capability. The American Cancer Society has concluded that the evidence does not support the use of EAV "as a method that can diagnose, cure, or otherwise help people with cancer" or "as a reliable aid in diagnosis or treatment of .. other illness" In double-blind trials, "A wide variability of the measurements was found in most patients irrespective of their allergy status and of the substance tested. Allergic patients showed more negative skin electrical response at the second trial, compared to normal controls, independent of the tested substance. No significant difference in skin electrical response between allergens and negative controls could be detected."

The use of electroacupuncture in veterinary medicine has been studied as well.  A literature review in the journal Animals found that on dogs with spinal cord injury, "electroacupuncture can be an excellent complementary therapy for veterinary patients’ pain control."

Safety
Researchers at the U.S. Food and Drug Administration (FDA) Center for Devices and Radiological Health (Rockville, Maryland) evaluated three representative devices intended for electrostimulation of acupuncture needles. The abstract at PubMed summarizes their findings:
"Three representative electrostimulators were evaluated to determine whether they meet the manufacturers' labeled nominal output parameters and how the measured parameters compare with a safety standard written for implanted peripheral nerve stimulators. The pulsed outputs (pulse width, frequency, and voltage) of three devices were measured with an oscilloscope across a 500-ohm resistance, meant to simulate subdermal tissue stimulated during electroacupuncture. For each device, at least two measured parameters were not within 25% of the manufacturer's claimed values. The measured values were compared with the American National Standard ANSI/AAMI NS15 safety standard for implantable peripheral nerve stimulators. Although for two stimulators the pulse voltage at maximum intensity was above that specified by the standard, short-term clinical use may still be safe because the standard was written for long-term stimulation. Similarly, the net unbalanced DC current, which could lead to tissue damage, electrolysis, and electrolytic degradation of the acupuncture needle, was within the limits of the standard at 30 pulses per second, but not at higher frequencies. The primary conclusions are (1) that the outputs of electrostimulators must be calibrated and (2) that practitioners must be adequately trained to use these electrostimulators safely."

See also
 Alternative medicine
 Microcurrent electrical neuromuscular stimulator
 Transcutaneous electrical nerve stimulation
 Electroconvulsive therapy

References

External links 
 
 Comments on the AANP Position on Electrodiagnosis from Quackwatch

Acupuncture
Pseudoscience
Energy therapies
Bioelectromagnetic-based therapies